PPCC  may refer to:

PPCC, the major debut single of the Japanese idol group BiS
Chinese People's Political Consultative Conference
Pikes Peak Community College, which changed its name to Pikes Peak State College
Països Catalans (i.e. Catalan Countries)
Punjab Pradesh Congress Committee